The Russian Athletics Championships is an annual outdoor track and field competition organised by the All-Russia Athletic Federation (ARAF), which serves as the Russian national championship for the sport. It is typically held as a four-day event in the Russian summer around late June to early August. The venue of the championships is decided on an annual basis.

The competition was first held in 1908, during the time of the Russian Empire. The competition had nine editions during this period, lasting up to 1916, at which point it was ceased as a result of the October Revolution and was effectively replaced in 1920 by the inauguration of the Soviet Athletics Championships. During this period, separate championships for the Russian Soviet Federative Socialist Republic were occasionally held (with the first two editions occurring in 1922 and 1927 in Moscow), though mostly the Russian championships was merged into the larger Soviet one. After the dissolution of the Soviet Union in 1991, Russia was restored as an independent country and the Russian Athletics Championships was re-initiated, starting from 1992 after a shared CIS Athletics Championships in 1991.

The modern Russian Championships are using as a qualifying event for selection for the international team for major events including the Olympic Games and the World Championships in Athletics.

Events
On the current programme a total of 38 individual Russian Championship athletics events are contested, divided evenly between men and women. For each of the sexes, there are six track running events, three obstacle events, four jumps, four throws, and two relays.

Track running
100 metres, 200 metres, 400 metres, 800 metres, 1500 metres, 5000 metres
Obstacle events
100 metres hurdles (women only), 110 metres hurdles (men only), 400 metres hurdles, 3000 metres steeplechase
Jumping events
Pole vault, high jump, long jump, triple jump
Throwing events
Shot put, discus throw, javelin throw, hammer throw
Relays
4 × 100 metres relay, 4 × 400 metres relay

Separate championships are held for the 10,000 metres, combined track and field events, racewalking, road running, cross country running (spring and autumn), mountain running (uphill and downhill), 24-hour run, and relay races. A winter outdoor throwing championships is also held in discus, javelin and hammer throw, while the shot put is incorporated into the Russian Indoor Athletics Championships.

Editions

Russian Empire

Russian Federation

Championships records

Men

Women

See also
List of Russian records in athletics

References

 

 
Athletics competitions in Russia
National athletics competitions
Recurring sporting events established in 1908
Recurring sporting events established in 1992
1908 establishments in the Russian Empire
1992 establishments in Russia
Athletics